The Ministry of Labour and Social Protection of Romania is one of the eighteen ministries of the Government of Romania.

The current Minister is Marius-Constantin Budăi.

Institutions 
The following institutions are under the authority of the Ministry of Labour and Social Protection:
 National House of Public Pensions (Casa Națională de Pensii Publice) www.cnpp.ro
 National Agency for Employment (Agenția Națională pentru Ocuparea Forței de Muncă) www.anofm.ro

The following institutions are subordinated to the Ministry of Labour and Social Protection:
 The National Authority for Disabled Persons (Autoritatea Națională pentru Persoanele cu Handicap) 
 The National Authority for the Protection of the Rights of the Child and Adoption (Autoritatea Națională pentru Protecția Drepturilor Copilului și Adopție) www.copii.ro
 National Agency for Payment and Social Inspection (Agenția Națională pentru Plăți și Inspecție Socială) 
 National Agency for Equal Opportunities for Women and Men (Agenția Națională pentru Egalitatea de Șanse între Femei și Bărbați) www.anes.ro
 Labour Inspection (Inspecția Muncii), including the Territorial Labour Inspectorates (Inspectoratele Teritoriale de Muncă) www.inspectmun.ro

See also
 Ministry of Labor, Family, and Social Protection (Moldova)

References

External links
 mmuncii.ro
 
 GUV.ro

Labor, Family, and Social Protection
Romania, Labor, Family, and Social Protection
Romania, Labor, Family, and Social Protection
Labor in Romania